Shelby Gap Railroad Station was an unincorporated community located in Pike County, Kentucky, United States. Its post office  closed in 2004.

References

Unincorporated communities in Pike County, Kentucky
Unincorporated communities in Kentucky